Κorres is a Greek company founded in 1996 in Athens by pharmacist Georgios Korres from the island of Naxos. 

The company produces beauty products for women and men, based on natural ingredients (and partly on homeopathy) and it was a pioneer in Greece in this sector.

Stores
As of June 2015, the company had stores in ten European countries and in Singapore and South Korea.

References

External links
Official Website
Private Pharma
McDaid Pharmacy

Companies based in Athens
Chemical companies established in 1996
Cosmetics companies of Greece
Greek brands
Homeopathic organizations
Skin care brands